Buxton railway station serves the Peak District town of Buxton in Derbyshire, England. It is managed and served by Northern.

History 

Two railways arrived in Buxton almost simultaneously in 1863. The Stockport, Disley and Whaley Bridge Railway, heavily promoted by the London and North Western Railway (LNWR), built its line from Manchester to Whaley Bridge and extended it to Buxton. Meanwhile, the Midland Railway extended the Manchester, Buxton, Matlock and Midlands Junction Railway from Rowsley. When the Midland extended its main line to New Mills in 1867, to bypass the LNWR, Buxton became a branch line from Millers Dale. The two railways planned separate stations, but the town's leaders were concerned that the railway would damage the character of the place and requested that they be built side by side, and be in keeping with the existing architecture of the town. Consequently, the LNWR and Midland station were given identical frontages designed by Joseph Paxton, each being built from local stone and having a wrought iron glazed train shed roof, fronted with identical half-circle fan widows.

The Midland station closed in 1967, along with the line to Rowsley, and the site is now a roadway. However, the line through Dove Holes Tunnel from Chinley is still used for freight, such as limestone from Tunstead, along with the old Midland branch into Buxton and part of the old Ashbourne Line (closed to passengers in October 1954), which remains in use to serve a lime works at Dowlow and the quarry at Hindlow. These both join the main line just outside the station, where there also a number of sidings to allow trains to reverse. The bay platform formerly used by Ashbourne line trains and the connecting curve from it towards Dowlow have been removed, though it is still possible to trace its route. The LNWR station now handles local trains into Manchester, using its line through Dove Holes and Chapel-en-le-Frith.

The trainshed roof of the remaining station was removed, leaving only the fan window and its stonework at the end of the station as a remnant. In 2009 the fan window was restored to its former glory.

Accidents 
 A runaway limestone train demolished the boiler room and gents toilet and damaged the porters' room in 1897, killing a passenger and injuring a porter. 
 A LNWR Class B boiler blew up in the station yard in 1921, killing the driver and fireman.

Facilities
The station is fully staffed, with a self-service ticket machine also available for use outside these times and for collecting pre-paid tickets. A payphone, waiting room and toilets are all provided in the main building, whilst platform 1 has a waiting shelter and bench seating. Step-free access is available to both platforms from the main entrance. In November 2022, Buxton became the first station in Derbyshire to install dementia-friendly signage.

Services 

Until May 2018, there was an hourly service daily (including Sundays) between Buxton and Manchester Piccadilly, taking about one hour. The service frequency was enhanced to about half-hourly in the morning and evening peaks.

From 21 May 2018, two trains per hour started running between Manchester and Buxton all day, one of which omits certain stations en route. The evening and Sunday service remains hourly and there are no longer any through trains north of Manchester.

Platform 2 is the main platform for arrivals and departures. Platform 1 is a departure platform by shunt move, which is usually used in early mornings by the first trains of the day.

Future 

Network Rail has proposed, in their North West route-specific utilisation strategy (RUS), installing a facing cross-over which will allow platform 1 to become fully operational as an arrival and departure platform. Doing this will reduce the number of shunt moves.

See also 
Listed buildings in Buxton

References

Bibliography 
 Radford, B., (1988) Midland Though The Peak Unicorn Books
 Pevsner, Nikolaus (1953) (revised Elizabeth Williamson 1978). The Buildings of England: Derbyshire. Penguin Books.

External links 

English Heritage – Buxton station frontage

Station
Railway stations in Derbyshire
DfT Category E stations 
Former London and North Western Railway stations
Railway stations in Great Britain opened in 1863
Northern franchise railway stations